Broderick Lee Fobbs (born August 2, 1974) is an American football coach. He served as the head football coach at Grambling State University from 2014 to 2021. After having served as an assistant coach at several other schools, on December 4, 2013, Fobbs was introduced as head coach of the Tigers.

Head coaching record

References

1974 births
Living people
African-American coaches of American football
American football running backs
Grambling State Tigers football coaches
Grambling State Tigers football players
Louisiana Ragin' Cajuns football coaches
McNeese Cowboys football coaches
Northwestern State Demons football coaches
Southern Miss Golden Eagles football coaches
High school football coaches in Louisiana
20th-century African-American sportspeople
21st-century African-American sportspeople